Union Township is a township in Lawrence County, Pennsylvania, United States. The population was 4,997 at the time of the 2020 census, a decline from the figure of 5,190 as of 2010.

Geography
According to the United States Census Bureau, the township has a total area of 9.7 square miles (25.0 km2), of which 9.6 square miles (24.9 km2) is land and 0.04 square miles (0.1 km2), or 0.41%, is water.

Unincorporated communities in the township include Harbor, Harbor Bridge, Parkstown, Belmar Park, Westview Heights, Oakwood, and Oakland.

Demographics
As of the census of 2000, there were 5,103 people, 2,121 households, and 1,495 families residing in the township.

The population density was 530.3 people per square mile (204.8/km2). There were 2,227 housing units at an average density of 231.4/sq mi (89.4/km2).

The racial makeup of the township was 94.92% White, 4.06% African American, 0.02% Native American, 0.16% Asian, 0.29% from other races, and 0.55% from two or more races. Hispanic or Latino of any race were 0.53% of the population.

There were 2,121 households, out of which 23.3% had children under the age of eighteen living with them; 55.2% were married couples living together, 11.2% had a female householder with no husband present, and 29.5% were non-families. 26.3% of all households were made up of individuals, and 15.1% had someone living alone who was sixty-five years of age or older.

The average household size was 2.40 and the average family size was 2.89.

In the township the population was spread out, with 18.9% under the age of eighteen, 6.9% from eighteen to twenty-four, 24.3% from twenty-five to forty-four, 26.5% from forty-five to sixty-four, and 23.5% who were sixty-five years of age or older. The median age was forty-five years.

For every one hundred females there were 91.4 males. For every one hundred females who were aged eighteen or older, there were 89.0 males.

The median income for a household in the township was $36,074, and the median income for a family was $41,909. Males had a median income of $32,297 compared with that of $21,378 for females.

The per capita income for the township was $16,717.

Roughly 3.9% of families and 5.6% of the population were living below the poverty line, including 5.6% of those who were under the age of eighteen and 4.7% of those who were aged sixty-five or older.

References

External links

Populated places established in 1798
Townships in Lawrence County, Pennsylvania